The 1992 Cincinnati Reds season saw the Reds finish in second place in the National League West with a record of 90 wins and 72 losses.

This was the final season in which the Reds donned the pullover jersey and beltless pants uniform style first worn in 1972 (the Reds being the last MLB team still wearing them). Following this season they switched back to a traditional baseball uniform. This was also the final season they wore their Big Red Machine era uniforms which were introduced in 1967.

Offseason
November 12, 1991: Jacob Brumfield was signed as a free agent.
November 12, 1991: Darnell Coles was signed as a free agent from the San Francisco Giants.
November 15, 1991: Greg Swindell was acquired from the Cleveland Indians for Jack Armstrong, Scott Scudder, and Joe Turek (minors).
November 15, 1991: Troy Afenir was signed as a free agent from the Oakland Athletics.
November 27, 1991: Eric Davis and Kip Gross were traded to the Los Angeles Dodgers for Tim Belcher and John Wetteland.
December 2, 1991: Bob Geren was selected off waivers from the New York Yankees.
December 8, 1991: Randy Myers was traded to the San Diego Padres for a player to be named later and Bip Roberts. The San Diego Padres sent Craig Pueschner (minors) to the Reds the next day to complete the trade.
December 11, 1991: John Wetteland was traded to the Montreal Expos for Dave Martinez.
February 2, 1992: Al Newman was signed as a free agent from the Minnesota Twins.
March 17, 1992: Bob Geren was released by the Reds.

Regular season

Season standings

Record vs. opponents

Transactions
April 1, 1992: Al Newman was released by the Cincinnati Reds.
June 9, 1992: Scott Service was signed as a free agent with the Cincinnati Reds.
July 6, 1992: Scott Coolbaugh was traded by the San Diego Padres to the Cincinnati Reds for Lenny Wentz (minors).

Roster

Player stats

Batting

Starters by position
Note: Pos = Position; G = Games played; AB = At bats; H = Hits; Avg. = Batting average; HR = Home runs; RBI = Runs batted in

Other batters 
Note: G = Games played; AB = At bats; H = Hits; Avg. = Batting average; HR = Home runs; RBI = Runs batted in

Pitching

Starting pitchers 
Note: G = Games pitched; IP = Innings pitched; W = Wins; L = Losses; ERA = Earned run average; SO = Strikeouts

Other pitchers 
Note: G = Games pitched; IP = Innings pitched; W = Wins; L = Losses; ERA = Earned run average; SO = Strikeouts

Relief pitchers 
Note: G = Games pitched; W = Wins; L = Losses; SV = Saves; ERA = Earned run average; SO = Strikeouts

Farm system 

LEAGUE CHAMPIONS: Cedar Rapids, Billings

Notes

References 
1992 Cincinnati Reds season at Baseball Reference

Cincinnati Reds season
Cincinnati Reds seasons
Cinc